The 1994 United States Senate election in Florida was held November 8, 1994. Incumbent Republican U.S. Senator Connie Mack III won re-election easily, earning a second term and carrying every county in the state.

With his victory, Mack became the first Republican ever to win reelection to the United States Senate from Florida.

Republican primary

Candidates 
 Connie Mack III, incumbent U.S. Senator

Results

Democratic primary

Candidates 
 Arturo Perez
 Hugh Rodham, public defender and brother to First Lady Hillary Clinton
 Ellis Rubin, criminal defense attorney
 Mike Wiley, talk radio personality and advocate of UFO conspiracy theories

Results

General election

Candidates 
 Connie Mack III (R), incumbent U.S. Senator
 Hugh Rodham (D), public defender and brother to first lady Hillary Clinton

Campaign 
Rodham left the public defenders office to run for the United States Senate in Florida in 1994. He won the Democratic Party nomination by defeating Mike Wiley in a runoff election, after earlier finishing first in a four-person primary field with 34 percent.  After the first primary, the third-place finisher, flamboyant Miami lawyer and perennial losing candidate Ellis Rubin, joined forces with Rodham as a "senior executive consultant" and hatchet man.  In the presence of Rodham at a press conference, Rubin levelled the accusation that Wiley was hiding his Jewish faith by changing his name from his birth name, Michael Schreibman, and that Wiley "changed his name before the campaign to deceive voters about his Jewish religion."  Wiley accordingly refused to endorse Rodham after the runoff.  Rodham then lost by a 70%-30% margin to incumbent Senator Republican Connie Mack III in the general election. Although Bill and Hillary Clinton both campaigned for him, his organization was unable to take advantage of their help, he had few funds, almost no television commercials, and little support from the Florida Democratic party establishment in a year that saw Republican gains everywhere.  After the election, Rubin switched allegiance again and charged Rodham with election law violations in the first primary; the Federal Elections Commission eventually dismissed the allegations.

Results

See also 

 1994 United States Senate elections

References 

Florida
1994
1994 Florida elections